Carwarp is a locality in Victoria, Australia, approximately 36 km from Mildura, Victoria.
Carwarp was the home town of Percy Stewart, a founding member of the Victorian Farmers Union, from which the Country Party (now National Party of Australia) emerged. Stewart served in both the Victorian Legislative Assembly, where he represented the electoral district of Mildura, and in the federal parliament for the Australian House of Representatives electorate of Wimmera. Another parliamentarian from Carwarp was Albert Allnutt, who represented the electoral district of Mildura in the Victorian Legislative Assembly from 1927 until 1945.

Carwarp is the proposed location for the Mildura Solar Concentrator Power Station.

The Post Office opened on 17 November 1913 and closed in 1992.

References

Towns in Victoria (Australia)
Mallee (Victoria)